Condé-en-Brie (literally Condé in Brie) is a commune in the Aisne department in Hauts-de-France in northern France.

The chateau of the family of the Marquis de Sade was located at the Condé-en-Brie.

Population

See also
 Château de Condé
 Communes of the Aisne department

References

Communes of Aisne
Aisne communes articles needing translation from French Wikipedia